NGC 73 is an intermediate spiral galaxy estimated to be about 350 million light-years away in the constellation of Cetus. It was discovered by Lewis A. Swift from the USA in 1886 and its apparent magnitude is 13.7.

References

External links
 

0073
001211
Cetus (constellation)
18861021
Discoveries by Lewis Swift
Intermediate spiral galaxies